Mimmo Sepe was born on April 16, 1955 in Naples, Campania, Italy as Domenico Sepe. He was an actor, known for No Thanks, Coffee Makes Me Nervous Now (1982), Nothing Underneath (1985) and Grazie al cielo c'è Totò (1991). He died on May 5, 2020 in Naples .

References

2020 deaths
Italian comedians